Edward "Ned" Mettam (18 August 1868 – 31 May 1943) was an English footballer who made 85 appearances in the Football League for Lincoln City, 99 appearances in all competitions. He played as a right half.

He later worked as a pub owner in his hometown of Lincoln, where he died in 1943.

References

1868 births
1943 deaths
Sportspeople from Lincoln, England
English footballers
Association football wing halves
Lincoln City F.C. players
Midland Football League players
English Football League players